The 100 Fishing Village Heritage Sites, more fully the , is an initiative of the  endorsed by the Ministry of Agriculture, Forestry and Fisheries, Japan.

Out of the original 350 submissions, a committee selected the final 100 fishing villages in 2006. The purpose of the initiative is to promote interest in and reuse of the historic and culturally important facilities of the fishing industry and their traditional styles and methods of construction. At the time of selection, some 6,291 fishing villages were recognized, one for every 5.5 km of the coast.

Sites

References

External links
  100 Fishing Village Heritage Sites

Japanese culture
Environment of Japan
Tourism in Japan
Economic history of Japan
History of fishing